Royal Air Force Fairlop or more simply RAF Fairlop is a former Royal Air Force satellite station situated near Ilford in Essex. Fairlop is now a district in the London Borough of Redbridge, England.

History

First World War 
A site to the east of RAF Fairlop called "Hainault Farm" was used during the First World War, and saw service as a Royal Air Force Home Defence Flight Station.

A number of airmen died at Fairlop during and shortly after the war. In 1919, Sergeant Russe J. Cound was killed and Captain Starbuck seriously injured when their plane stalled and crashed from a height of 200 feet.

Between the wars 
A small flying club used another nearby site between the wars and there were plans to build a commercial airport in the Fairlop area for London, but those plans were later abandoned due to the realization that smog and haze from the residential and industrial areas nearby would be a hazard to operations. A further three sites just to the north of Fairlop and Hainault Farm were used as civilian aerodromes mid-war.

Second World War 
The airfield at Fairlop was built in late 1940 when three concrete runways in an "A" pattern tilted 45 degrees anti-clockwise were constructed. The airfield became operational in September 1941 with the arrival of No. 603 (City of Edinburgh) Squadron RAF, flying Supermarine Spitfires, previously stationed at RAF Hornchurch. The adjacent Hainault Lodge was used as officer accommodation. In June 1944 RAF Fairlop became home to No. 24 Balloon Centre with four squadrons forming part of the balloon barrage around London. The balloons were manned by members of the Women's Auxiliary Air Force. No 24 Balloon Centre was disbanded in February 1945 and the airfield closed in August 1946.

After the wars 
In 1947, plans we revived to build a commercial airport at Fairlop. At the time, it was reported that Fairlop could become the "No. 1 continental airport", but again the plans fell through. By 1950, the airfield was disused.

Squadrons
Squadrons stationed at RAF Fairlop:

The following units were also here at some point:
 No. 24 Balloon Centre
 No. 945/947 (Balloon) Sqn
 No. 965 (Balloon) Sqn
 No. 967 (Balloon) Sqn
 No. 970 (Balloon) Sqn
 No. 998 (Balloon) Sqn
 No. 54 Training Depot Station
 No. 207 Training Depot Station
 No. 121 Airfield
 No. 136 Airfield
 No. 146 Gliding School RAF
 No. 147 Gliding School RAF
 No. 2709 Squadron RAF Regiment
 No. 2737 Squadron RAF Regiment
 No. 2797 Squadron RAF Regiment
 No. 2811 Squadron RAF Regiment
 No. 2889 Squadron RAF Regiment
 No. 4077 Anti-Aircraft Flight RAF Regiment
 No. 4269 Anti-Aircraft Flight RAF Regiment
 No. 4335 Anti-Aircraft Flight RAF Regiment

Current use

The site was used for gravel extraction and became a country park known as Fairlop Waters with sailing facilities and a golf course. In November 2013 a sculpture was unveiled commemorating those who served at the Fairlop and Hainault airfields in wartime.

See also
List of former Royal Air Force stations

References

Citations

Bibliography

External links

David Martin – RNAS, RFC and RAF Station Fairlop

Royal Air Force stations in London
History of the London Borough of Redbridge